The Clearing is a 2019 true crime podcast about April Balascio, daughter of American serial killer Edward Wayne Edwards. It premiered on 18 July 2019 and is a production of Pineapple Street Media and Gimlet Media. In 2009, April began to suspect her father of the 1980 murder of Tim Hack and Kelly Drew. Following her report to the police, Edwards was arrested and confessed to several other murders. He later became the subject of conspiracy theories accusing him of involvement in famous unsolved crimes. Featuring interviews from April and private recordings made by Edwards while he was living, The Clearing discusses April's journey to discover the truth about her father's life.

Background
In 1980, teenagers Tim Hack and Kelly Drew were murdered in Wisconsin. In 2009, April Balascio saw a news article about the murders and became suspicious that her father, Edward Wayne Edwards, was involved; she called in a tip to the police. In 2010, Edwards (then 77 years old) was sentenced to life in prison for the murders. After his arrest, Edwards pled guilty to three more murders, including that of his foster son. Edwards died in prison in 2011.

Several years after Edwards died, veteran journalist Josh Dean reached out to Balascio. Dean was investigating conspiracy theories which tied Edwards to the deaths of several other high-profile crime victims, such as JonBenét Ramsey and Laci Peterson. He knew that these conspiracies were untrue, but he suspected that Edwards was involved in other killings. April suspected her father of more murders and was frustrated with the media for focusing on famous cases instead of cases which she believed he actually could have committed. Balascio and Dean became friends and began to investigate her father's life and crimes.

Episodes

Reception
Miranda Sawyer of The Guardian called The Clearing "an immense achievement", comparing it positively to shows such as Serial. Sawyer stated that Balascio's emotional articulacy provided the show with authenticity. It stated that the show is "not like the movies", focusing on the difficulties of solving cold cases in the face of police disinterest. The review praised the podcast's discussions of the mythologization of serial killers, as well as the trauma for family members of victims of unsolved murders.

Some true crime podcasts have been accused of exploiting the families of crime victims for fame. However, EJ Dickson of Rolling Stone found that Balascio's involvement with The Clearing's production elevated the show. The review also stated that The Clearing critiques other true crime podcasts by setting out to debunk rumors about Edwards, in contrast to shows which may promote theories not based on evidence.

Nicholas Quah of Vulture found that the use of Edwards' personal tapes helped to focus the show on Edwards as a human being, pushing past the "conventional elements of standard true-crime fare".

The first episode of the podcast won "Podcast Episode of the Year" at the 2019 Adweek Podcast Awards.

Notes
Although Ed Edwards never legally adopted Dannie, Dannie changed his last name to Edwards and called him "dad".

References

External links
 

2019 podcast debuts
Audio podcasts
Crime podcasts
Investigative journalism
2019 podcast endings
Gimlet Media
American podcasts
1980 in Wisconsin
Crime in Wisconsin